Ocularia undulatofasciata is a species of beetle in the family Cerambycidae. It was described by Lepesme and Stephan von Breuning in 1955.

Subspecies
 Ocularia undulatofasciata legrandi Téocchi, Jiroux & Sudre, 2004
 Ocularia undulatofasciata undulatofasciata Lepesme & Breuning, 1952

References

Oculariini
Beetles described in 1955
Taxa named by Stephan von Breuning (entomologist)
Taxa named by Pierre Lepesme